Microsoft Mouse and Keyboard Center is software that provides drivers for recent Microsoft mice and keyboards. It allows the user to set up and configure both mice and keyboards from within the same program.

Features

Whereas Microsoft mice and Microsoft keyboards were previously controlled from two separate programsIntelliPoint and IntelliTypethe Mouse and Keyboard Center is responsible for both kinds of devices. 32- and 64-bit versions of the software are available, and the program integrates with Windows 8 and above's "Modern UI" interface. When the program is launched after installation it will automatically detect the user's compatible mice and keyboards if they are connected to the PC. It allows for reassignment of some buttons and keys, as well as recording macros and additional functionality like a screen magnifier, and pointer precision enhancer (DPI changer).

Microsoft Mouse and Keyboard Center supports USB and Bluetooth devices; it does not support (automatically detect and configure) PS/2 and some older USB devices, as detailed in the following sections.  Most are still supported in the latest corresponding versions of IntelliType Pro and IntelliPoint, although they can no longer be downloaded from Microsoft.

Security vulnerabilities

According to Ofir Moskovitch, a security researcher, Microsoft released Microsoft Mouse and Keyboard Center 3.2.116 with major cryptographic security issues, including Hash Collision Vulnerability. The vulnerable package was available for nearly a month on the official Microsoft website. Moskovitch informed Microsoft about it and it was fixed in an update.

Unsupported mice

 Comfort Optical Mouse 1000
 Comfort Optical Mouse 3000
 Compact Optical Mouse
 Designer Bluetooth Mouse
 IntelliMouse
 IntelliMouse Explorer 4.0
 IntelliMouse Explorer for Bluetooth
 IntelliMouse Optical
 Laser Mouse 6000
 Mobile Memory Mouse 8000
 Notebook Optical Mouse
 Optical Mouse
 Optical Mouse by Starck
 Optical Mouse 100
 Optical Mouse 200
 Standard Wireless Optical Mouse
 Wheel Mouse
 Wheel Mouse Optical
 Wireless IntelliMouse Explorer 2.0
 Wireless IntelliMouse Explorer for Bluetooth
 Wireless IntelliMouse Explorer with Fingerprint Reader
 Wireless Notebook Laser Mouse 6000
 Wireless Notebook Laser Mouse 7000
 Wireless Notebook Optical Mouse
 Wireless Notebook Optical Mouse 3000
 Wireless Laser Mouse 6000

Unsupported keyboards

 Internet Keyboard
 Keyboard Elite for Bluetooth
 Keyboard with Fingerprint Reader
 MultiMedia Keyboard
 Natural MultiMedia Keyboard
 Wired Keyboard 500
 Wireless Comfort Keyboard
 Wireless Comfort Keyboard 4000
 Wireless Desktop Elite Keyboard
 Wireless Laser Keyboard 5000
 Wireless MultiMedia Keyboard
 Wireless Optical Desktop for Bluetooth Keyboard
 Wireless Photo Keyboard
+ Designer Keyboard

See also
 IntelliPoint
 IntelliType

References

Microsoft software
Utilities for Windows